George Clayton Stapleton (June 24, 1921October 30, 2014) was an American football player, coach, and college athletics administrator.

Stapleton grew up in Fleming-Neon, Kentucky, where he played basketball and football for the Fleming High School Pirates. He was later recruited by the University of Tennessee and played as a guard for the Volunteers over the span of a few seasons between 1941 and 1947. Stapleton began working as an assistant football coach in 1950, and became the head coach at Iowa State University in 1958.

Stapleton served as the head football coach at Iowa State from 1958 until 1967, compiling a record of 42–53–4. Stapleton was known for his single-wing offense and notorious for punting on third down. He is also well-known for coaching Iowa State's "Dirty Thirty" – the 1959 team that started the season with only 30 healthy players – to a 7–3 record, coming one game shy of earning a bid to the Orange Bowl. He served as Iowa State's athletic director following his coaching stint, from 1967 to 1970. He was the athletic director at Florida State University from 1971 to 1973 and at Vanderbilt University from 1973 to 1978. Stapleton played college football at the University of Tennessee for head coach Robert Neyland.

On September 9, 2006, Stapleton was inducted into the Iowa State Athletics Hall of Fame with fellow alumni Beth Bader, Jon Brown, John Crawford, Barry Hill, Russ Hoffman, Jerry McNertney, Hugo Otopalik, Keith Sims, and Winnifred Tilden.

Stapleton died on October 30, 2014, in Marshall, Missouri, at the age of 93.

Head coaching record

References

External links
 Iowa State University Athletic Hall of Fame profile

1921 births
2014 deaths
American football guards
Florida State Seminoles athletic directors
Iowa State Cyclones athletic directors
Iowa State Cyclones football coaches
Oregon State Beavers football coaches
Tennessee Volunteers football players
Vanderbilt Commodores athletic directors
Wofford Terriers football coaches
Wyoming Cowboys football coaches
People from Letcher County, Kentucky